Joylong Automobile (officially Jiangsu Joylong Automobile Co., Ltd.), is a Chinese automobile and bus manufacturer based in Shanghai. It was established in 2007. Sales mainly cover Asian, Middle Eastern, South American, and African countries.

History
The company was founded in 2007 in Yangzhou, Jiangsu Province.

Models
Joylong produces MPVs, vans, and minibuses. The following is a list of vehicles produced by the company:

MPVs
 EM3, a mini electric MPV
 EM5, a compact electric MPV
 iFly, a minivan
 EF5, an electric version of the iFly
 EF9, an electric version of the iFly

Vans (A-series)
 A-Series, a passenger and cargo van series:
 A4, a passenger variant
 EW4, an electric version of the A4
 A5, a long wheelbase passenger variant
 EW5, an electric version of the A5
 A6, an extra long wheelbase passenger variant
 ARV, a camper variant
 V300, a cargo variant
 VIP-A, a luxury variant

Minibuses (C-series)
 C-series, a minibus series
 C6, a minibus
 HKL6700, a copy of the Toyota Coaster

Product Gallery

References

External links
Joylong Automobile website

Bus manufacturers of China
Chinese brands
Manufacturing companies based in Shanghai
Motor vehicle manufacturers of China
Vehicle manufacturing companies established in 2007